The Team event competition at the 2019 World Aquatics Championships was held on 16 July 2019.

Results
The final was started at 20:45.

References

Team event
World Aquatics Championships